The 2017 New Jersey State Senate elections were held on November 7, 2017, to elect Senators for all 40 legislative districts across New Jersey. These elections coincided with the election of Governor Phil Murphy. The winners of this election serve in the 218th New Jersey Legislature, with seats apportioned based on the 2010 United States census. The Democratic Party grew its majority in the Senate, with incumbent Senate President Steve Sweeney re-elected to the top leadership post. Republican Thomas Kean, Jr. continued to lead his party as Minority Leader. This was the first state Senate election cycle in 10 years where any party flipped a Senate seat.

Summary of results 

!style="background-color:#E9E9E9" align=center rowspan= 2 colspan=2| Parties
!style="background-color:#E9E9E9" align=center colspan=4| Seats
!style="background-color:#E9E9E9" align=center colspan=3| Popular vote
|- bgcolor=#E9E9E9
| align="center" | 2013
| align="center" |2017
| align="center" |+/−
| align="center" |Strength
| align="center" |Vote
| align="center" |%
| align="center" |Change
|-
| style="background-color:;" | 
| align="left" | Democratic Party
| align="right" | 24
| align="right" | 25
| align="right" |  1
| align="right" | 62.50%
| align="right" | 1,185,420
| align="right" | 59.5%
| align="right" | +12.1%
|-
| style="background-color:;" | 
| align="left" | Republican Party
| align="right" | 16
| align="right" | 15
| align="right" |  1
| align="right" | 37.50%
| align="right" | 802,418
| align="right" | 40.3%
| align="right" | −11.8%
|-
| style="background-color:;" | 
| align="left" | Green Party
| align="right" | -
| align="right" | -
| align="right" | -
| align="right" | -
| align="right" | 1,306
| align="right" | 0.1%
| align="right" | -
|-
| style="background-color:;" | 
| align="left" | Libertarian Party
| align="right" | -
| align="right" | -
| align="right" | -
| align="right" | -
| align="right" | 574
| align="right" | <0.1%
| align="right" | −0.1%
|-
| style="background-color:;" | 
| align="left" | Independent
| align="right" | -
| align="right" | -
| align="right" | -
| align="right" | -
| align="right" | 2,545
| align="right" | 0.1%
| align="right" | −0.4%
|- bgcolor=CCCCCC
| align="center" colspan="2" | Totals
| align="center" | 40
| align="center" | 40
| align="center" | 0
| align="center" | 100.0%
| align="center" | 1,992,263
| align="center" | 100.0%
| align="center" | -
|- bgcolor=E9E9E9
| align="left" colspan=9|Source:  Election Statistics – New Jersey Secretary of State (note: does not include blank, write-in and over/under votes)
|-
|}

Close races 
Seats where the margin of victory was under 10%:
 
 
 
 
  gain
  gain

Incumbents not seeking re-election

Democratic

 Raymond Lesniak, District 20 (running for Governor)

Republican

 Diane Allen, District 7
 Joe Kyrillos, District 13

In addition, four members who were elected in the last election in 2013 have since left office: Donald Norcross (D-5th, resigned), Peter J. Barnes III (D-18th, resigned), Kevin J. O'Toole (R-40th, resigned), and Jim Whelan (D-2nd, died in office).

Summary of results by State Senate district

Results by district

District 1

Democratic primary
Declared
 Jeff Van Drew, incumbent senator

Results

Republican primary
Declared
 Mary Gruccio, Superintendent of Vineland Public Schools and former Cumberland County Freeholder
Results

Independents and third parties
Declared
 Anthony Parisi Sanchez (Independent), community activist and former Marine Corps reservist

General election
Endorsements

Polling

Results

District 2

Incumbent Democratic Senator Jim Whelan declined to seek a fourth term, announcing his retirement on January 4, 2017. Whelan died in office on August 22.

Democratic primary
Declared
 Colin Bell, former Atlantic County Freeholder and nominee for Assembly in 2015
Withdrawn
 Vince Mazzeo, state assemblyman (running for re-election)
Results

Following the death of Whelan on August 22, 2017, Bell was unanimously selected to fill the remainder of his term by local Democratic committee members on September 5, and was sworn in on October 5.

Republican primary
Declared
 Chris A. Brown, state assemblyman
Results

General election
Endorsements

Polling

Results

District 3

Democratic primary
Declared
 Stephen M. Sweeney, incumbent senator
Results

Republican primary
Declared
 Fran Grenier, chairman of the Salem County Republican Party and former Woodstown Borough Councilman
Results

General election
Polling

Endorsements

Results

District 4

Democratic primary
Declared
 Fred H. Madden, incumbent senator
Results

Republican primary
Declared
 Michael Pascetta
Results

Pascetta was not on the official list of candidates for the general election.

General election
Endorsements

Results

District 5

Democratic primary
Declared
 Nilsa Cruz-Perez, incumbent senator
Results

Republican primary
Declared
 Keith Walker, nominee for Senate in 2011 and 2013
Results

Independents and third parties
Declared
 Mohammad Kabir (Independent)

General election
Endorsements

Results

District 6

Democratic primary
Declared
 James Beach, incumbent senator
Results

Republican primary
Declared
 Robert Shapiro
Results

General election
Endorsements

Results

District 7

Citing health concerns, incumbent Republican Senator Diane Allen declined to run for a seventh term, announcing her retirement on January 31, 2017.

Republican primary
Declared
 Rob Prisco, Riverside Township Committeeman and nominee for Assembly in 2015
Results

On June 13, Governor Chris Christie nominated Prisco to a worker's compensation judgeship, whom consequently would later drop out. Local Republican committee members selected Delanco Mayor John Browne as a replacement candidate on September 6.

Democratic primary
Declared
 Troy Singleton, state assemblyman

Withdrawn
 Cory Cottingham
Declined
 Herb Conaway, state assemblyman (running for re-election)
 Carol A. Murphy, director of policy and communication for Assemblywoman Gabriela Mosquera (running for Assembly)

Results

General election
Endorsements

Results

District 8

Republican primary
Declared
 Dawn Marie Addiego, incumbent senator
Results

Democratic primary
Declared
 George B. Youngkin
Results

General election
Endorsements 

Results

District 9

Republican primary
Declared
 Christopher J. Connors, incumbent senator
Results

Democratic primary
Declared
 Brian Corley White, attorney
Results

General election
Endorsements

Results

District 10

Republican primary
Declared
 James W. Holzapfel, incumbent senator
Results

Democratic primary
Declared
 Emma Mammano, mental health counselor
Results

General election
Endorsements

Results

District 11

Republican primary
Declared
 Jennifer Beck, incumbent senator
Results

Democratic primary
Declared
 Vin Gopal, businessman, nominee for Assembly in 2011, and former chairman of the Monmouth County Democratic Party (resigned upon declaration)
Results

General election
Endorsements

Polling

Results

District 12

Republican primary
Declared
 Art Haney, chairman of the Old Bridge Republican Party and former mayor of Old Bridge
 Samuel D. Thompson, incumbent senator
Endorsements

Results

Democratic primary
Declared
 David Lande, attorney
Results

Independents and third parties
Declared
 Kevin Antoine (Independent), SUNY health professor

General election
Endorsements 

Results

District 13

Incumbent Republican Senator Joe Kyrillos announced that he would not run for a ninth term on October 25, 2016.

Republican primary
Declared
 Declan O'Scanlon, state assemblyman
Withdrawn
 Amy Handlin, state assemblywoman (running for re-election)
Results

Democratic primary
Declared
 Sean Byrnes, former Middletown Township Committeeman
 Joshua Leinsdorf, former Princeton school board member and perennial candidate
Results

General election
Endorsements

Results

District 14

Democratic primary
Declared
 Linda R. Greenstein, incumbent senator
Results

Republican primary
Declared
 Bruce MacDonald, jewelry store owner
 Ileana Schirmer, Hamilton Township (Mercer) Councilwoman
Results

General election
Endorsements

Results

District 15

Democratic primary
Declared
 Shirley Turner, incumbent senator
Results

Republican primary
Declared
 Lee Eric Newton
Results

General election
Endorsements

Results

District 16

Republican primary
Declared
 Christopher Bateman, incumbent senator
Results

Democratic primary
Declared
 Laurie Poppe, attorney, social worker, and nominee for Hillsborough Township Committee in 2015 and 2016
Withdrawn
 Zenon Christodoulu, businessman
Declined
 Andrew Koontz, Mercer County Freeholder
 Liz Lempert, Mayor of Princeton
 Andrew Zwicker, state assemblyman (running for re-election)
Results

General election
Endorsements

Polling

Results

District 17

Democratic primary
Declared
 Bill Irwin, Piscataway Board of Education President
 Bob Smith, incumbent senator
Results

Republican primary
Declared
 Daryl J. Kipnis, attorney
Results

General election
Endorsements

Results

District 18

Democratic primary
Declared
 Patrick J. Diegnan, incumbent senator
Results

Republican primary
Declared
 Mark Csizmar, former East Brunswick Police officer and nominee for East Brunswick Township Council in 2016
Results

Csizmar was replaced on the ballot for the general election by Lewis Glogower, who was previously one of the nominees for the Assembly seat.

General election
Endorsements

Results

District 19

Democratic primary
Declared
 Joe Vitale, incumbent senator
Results

Republican primary
Declared
 Arthur J. Rittenhouse Jr.
Results

Following the primary, Rittenhouse dropped out of the race on September 14.

General election
Endorsements

Results

District 20

Incumbent Democratic Senator Raymond Lesniak declined to run for re-election and instead ran for governor.

Democratic primary
Declared
 Joseph Cryan, Union County Sheriff, former state assemblyman, and former chairman of the New Jersey Democratic State Committee
Results

Republican primary
Declared
 Ashraf Hanna
Results

General election
Endorsements

Results

District 21

Republican primary
Declared
 Thomas Kean Jr., incumbent senator
Results

Democratic primary
Declared
 Jill LaZare, attorney and nominee for Assembly in 2013 and 2015
Results

General election
Endorsements

Results

District 22

Democratic primary
Declared
 Nicholas Scutari, incumbent senator
Results

Republican primary
Declared
 Joseph A. Bonilla
Results

General election
Endorsements

Results

District 23

Republican primary
Declared
 Michael J. Doherty, incumbent senator
Results

Democratic primary
Declared
 Christine Lui Chen, health care executive
Results

General election
Endorsements

Results

District 24

Republican primary
Declared
 William Hayden, NJDOT employee and vice president of the Skylands Tea Party
 Steve Oroho, incumbent senator
Withdrawn
 Gail Phoebus, state assemblywoman
Results

Democratic primary
Declared
 Jennifer Hamilton, attorney

Results

General election
Endorsements

Results

District 25

Republican primary
Declared
 Anthony Bucco, incumbent senator
Results

Democratic primary
Declared
 Lisa Bhimani, OB/GYN
Results

General election
Endorsements

Results

District 26

Republican primary
Declared
 Joseph Pennacchio, incumbent senator
Declined
 Tom Mastrangelo, Morris County Freeholder
Results

Democratic primary
Declared
 Elliot Isibor, nominee for Assembly in 2011 and 2013
Results

General election
Endorsements

Results

District 27

Democratic primary
Declared
 Richard Codey, incumbent senator
Results

Republican primary
Declared
 Pasquale "Pat" Capozzoli, Caldwell Borough Councilman
Results

General election
Endorsements

Results

District 28

Democratic primary
Declared
 Ronald Rice, incumbent senator
Results

Republican primary
No Republicans filed.
Results

Independents and third parties
Declared
 Troy Knight-Napper (Green)

General election
Endorsements

Results

District 29

Democratic primary
Declared
 Teresa Ruiz, incumbent senator
Results

Republican primary
Declared
 Maria E. Lopez
Results

Independents and third parties
Declared
 Pablo Olivera (One Nation Party), perennial candidate

General election
Endorsements

Results

District 30

Republican primary
Declared
 Robert Singer, incumbent senator
Results

Democratic primary
Declared
 Amy Sara Cores, attorney
Results

General election
Endorsements

Results

District 31

Democratic primary
Declared
 Sandra Bolden Cunningham, incumbent senator
Declined
 Angela V. McKnight, state assemblywoman (running for re-election)
Results

Republican primary
Declared
 Herminio Mendoza
Results

General election
Endorsements

Results

District 32

Democratic primary
Declared
 Nicholas Sacco, incumbent senator
Results

Republican primary
Declared
 Paul Castelli
Results

General election
Endorsements

Results

District 33

Democratic primary
Declared
 Brian P. Stack, incumbent senator
Results

Republican primary
Declared
 Beth Hamburger
Results

General election

Results

District 34

Democratic primary
Declared
 Nia Gill, incumbent senator
Results

Republican primary
Declared
 Mahir Saleh
Results

General election
Endorsements

Results

District 35

Democratic primary
Declared
 Nellie Pou, incumbent senator
 Haytham Younes, real estate investor and candidate for Paterson City Council in 2014
Results

Republican primary
Declared
 Marwan Sholakh
Results

General election
Endorsements

Results

District 36

Democratic primary
Declared
 Paul Sarlo, incumbent senator
Results

Republican primary
Declared
 Jeanine Ferrara
Results

General election
Endorsements

Results

District 37

Democratic primary
Declared
 Loretta Weinberg, incumbent senator
Results

Republican primary
Declared
 Eric P. Fisher
 Modesto Romero
Results

General election
Endorsements

Results

District 38

Democratic primary
Declared
 Robert M. Gordon, incumbent senator
Results

Republican primary
Declared
 Kelly Langschultz, New Milford Borough Councilwoman
Declined
 John Cosgrove, Mayor of Fair Lawn
Results

General election
Endorsements

Results

District 39

Republican primary
Declared
 Gerald Cardinale, incumbent senator
Withdrawn
 John McCann, former Cresskill borough councilman
Results

Democratic primary
Declared
 Linda Schwager, Mayor of Oakland
Results

Independents and third parties
Declared
 James Tosone (Libertarian)

General election
Endorsements

Results

District 40

Incumbent Republican Senator Kevin J. O'Toole announced on January 15, 2016, that he would not run for re-election. On March 13, 2017, he was confirmed by the state senate to the board of commissioners of The Port Authority of New York and New Jersey. O'Toole however did not immediately resign to accept the position, staying for the time being in his Senate seat to "tie up loose ends." He officially resigned his seat on July 1.

Republican primary
Declared
 Edward Buttimore, former investigator for the New Jersey Attorney General
 Kristin Corrado, Passaic County Clerk
 Paul DiGaetano, chairman of the Bergen County Republican Party and former state assemblyman (District 36)
Results

Following O'Toole's resignation, Corrado was selected without opposition by local Republican committee members to serve the remainder of his term on July 26, and was sworn in on October 5.

Democratic primary
Declared
 Thomas Duch, Garfield City Manager
Results

General election
Endorsements

Polling

Results

References 

2017
Senate
New Jersey State Senate